The 1950–51 Georgetown Hoyas men's basketball team represented Georgetown University during the 1950–51 NCAA college basketball season. Francis "Buddy" O'Grady coached it in his second season as head coach. The team was an independent and moved to Uline Arena in Washington, D.C., for its home games this season. It finished with a record of 8-14 and had no post-season play.

Season recap

The 1950–51 team was a youthful one, with a roster that included only one senior and four juniors, the other ten players being sophomores. Seven of those sophomores had arrived on the varsity team from a freshman team that had had great success the previous year, posting a 16-1 record.

Sophomore center Bill Bolger was among the new arrivals. Playing in all 22 games, he scored 20 or more points in five of the final 11 games of the season, averaging 12.7 points per game for the year.

Another standout sophomore was guard Barry Sullivan, who debuted in the first game of the season with 22 points against Geneva. He followed that by scoring in double figures in 16 of the next 17 games, including 25 points against Long Island and another 25-point performance against American in the next game five days later. He missed the last four games of the season due to illness, but averaged a team-leading 16.1 points per game for the season.

Sophomore center Hugh Beins scored in double figures in seven of eight games at midseason and had a season-high 19 points against Mount St. Mary's. His performance tailed off later in the season, but he would return for two more years as one of the top players in Georgetown history.

The young and inexperienced team started with an 8-6 record but ended the season with an eight-game losing streak that gave it a final record of 8-14. It had no post-season play and was not ranked in the Top 20 in the Associated Press Poll or in the Top 30 in the Coaches' Poll – which began this season – at any time.

No Georgetown men's basketball team had played its home games on campus since the 1926-27 team had used Ryan Gymnasium as its home court, but the 1950–51 squad was the last Georgetown men's basketball team to play its home games in an off-campus facility until the 1981-82 team moved to the Capital Centre in Landover, Maryland. Ground had been broken on campus for the construction of McDonough Gymnasium, which would host Georgetowns home games for 30 years beginning the next season.

Roster
Sources

1950–51 schedule and results

It had been a common practice for many years for colleges and universities to include non-collegiate opponents in their schedules, with the games recognized as part of their official record for the season, and the February 3, 1951, game against the New York Athletic Club therefore counted as part of Georgetowns won-loss record for 1950–51. It was not until 1952 after the completion of the 1951–52 season that the National Collegiate Athletic Association (NCAA) ruled that colleges and universities could no longer count games played against non-collegiate opponents in their annual won-loss records.

Sources

|-
!colspan=9 style="background:#002147; color:#8D817B;"| Regular Season

Notes

References

Georgetown Hoyas men's basketball seasons
Georgetown
Georgetown Hoyas men's basketball team
Georgetown Hoyas men's basketball team